The Cartier Champion Three-year-old Filly is an award in European horse racing, founded in 1991, and sponsored by Cartier SA as part of the Cartier Racing Awards. The award winner is decided by points earned in group races plus the votes cast by British racing journalists and readers of the Racing Post and The Daily Telegraph newspapers.

Records
Leading trainer (5 wins):
 John Gosden – Ryafan (1997), The Fugue (2012), Taghrooda (2014), Enable (2017), Star Catcher (2019)

Leading owner (5 wins):
 Sue Magnier – Peeping Fawn (2007), Legatissimo (2015), Minding (2016), Love (2020), Snowfall
 Michael Tabor – Peeping Fawn (2007), Legatissimo (2015), Minding (2016), Love (2020), Snowfall

Winners

References

Horse racing awards